Zwart is a Dutch surname meaning "black". It  may refer to:

Adrianus Zwart (1903–1981), Dutch artist
Harald Zwart (born 1965), Dutch-Norwegian film director
 (1877–1937), Dutch organist
 (1924–2012), Dutch geologist and petrographer
Jeff Zwart (born 1955), American commercial film director
Piet Zwart (1885–1977), Dutch photographer, typographer, and industrial designer
Tamara Zwart (born 1975), Dutch synchronized swimmer
 (1925–1997), Dutch organist

See also
De Zwart
Swart
Zwarts

Dutch-language surnames